Paqueta is a monotypic moth genus in the subfamily Lymantriinae. Its only species, Paqueta sankuruensis, is found in Zaire. Both the genus and the species were first described by Ugo Dall'Asta in 1981.

References

Lymantriinae
Monotypic moth genera
Endemic fauna of the Democratic Republic of the Congo